Alexander Pavlovich Bezak (1800 – December 30, 1868) was an Imperial Russian Army general. He commanded the Kiev Military District from 1865 to 1868, and simultaneously was Governor-General of the Southwestern Krai. During his time as the governor-general of the Southwestern Krai, he implemented civil and economic reforms, which included promoting the advancement of ethnic Russian bureaucrats and reducing the rights available to the Polish szlachta and Jews.

References

External links
 Андреевский кавалер — Александр Павлович Безак
 Безак Александр Павлович
 Семёнов В. Г., Семёнова В. П.

1800 births
1868 deaths
Russian people of the November Uprising
Russian military personnel of the Crimean War